Baranovka is a rural locality (a selo) and the administrative center of Baranovsky Selsoviet, Narimanovsky District, Astrakhan Oblast, Russia. The population was 676 as of 2010. There are 10 streets.

Geography 
Baranovka is located 16 km north of Narimanov (the district's administrative centre) by road. Petropavlovka is the nearest rural locality.

References 

Rural localities in Narimanovsky District